The 12th South Carolina Infantry Regiment was an infantry regiment that served in the Confederate States Army during the American Civil War.

Formation
In answer to the call of President of the Provisional Government of the Confederate States of America, Jefferson Davis, on or around the 1 July 1861, companies of volunteers from all over the Secessionist States began to bring themselves forward. The volunteers from South Carolina rendezvoused at Columbia, South Carolina, and were sent to a camp of instruction. This camp was located around five miles from Columbia, at Lightwoodknot Springs; there the men were allowed to elect their field officers. The first regiment to be formed was numbered as the 12th South Carolina Volunteers.
The regiments' officers were, at its beginning:

Commanding Officer: Colonel R.G. Mills Dunovant

Second in Command: Lieutenant Colonel Dixon Barnes

Chief of Staff: Major Cadwallader Jones

Companies

Company A (Bonham Rifles): York County
Captain L.W. Grist
Captain J.T. Parker
Captain W.H. McCorkle
Company B (Campbell Rifles): York County
Captain John Lucas Miller
Captain W.S. Dunlop
Company C: Fairfield County
Captain J.A. Hinnant
Captain J.R. Thomas
Captain H.C. Davis
Company D:
Captain E.F. Bookter
Captain J.H. Kinsler
Captain J.C. Smith
Company E: Lancaster County
Captain C.F. Hinson
Captain T.F. Clyburn

Company F (Means Lights Infantry): Fairfield County
Captain Hayne McMeekin
Captain J.C. Bell
Company G: Pickens County
Captain A.D. Gaillard
Captain John M. McMoody
Company H: York County
Captain Cadwallader Jones
Captain G.E. McSteele
Captain R.M. Kerr
Company I: Lancaster County
Captain N.B. Vanlandingham
Captain Dixon Barnes
Captain William J. Stover
Company K: Pickens County
Captain J.C. Nevill

See also
List of South Carolina Confederate Civil War units

References

External links
http://www.nps.gov/civilwar/search-regiments-detail.htm?regiment_id=CSC0012RI

Units and formations of the Confederate States Army from South Carolina
1861 establishments in South Carolina
Military units and formations established in 1861